Captain Josiah W. Macy Jr. (c. 1837 – October 5, 1876) was an American sea captain and philanthropist.

Biography 
Macy was born into a philanthropic family. The elder Josiah W. Macy established a shipping and commission firm in New York City, after leaving the family home in Nantucket, Massachusetts, where his family had settled during the early 17th century. Josiah Macy's sons and grandsons earned their money from an oil company that was later incorporated into the Standard Oil Company under the Rockefeller family.

Macy's eldest daughter Mary K. Macy (later Willets), born in 1860, died in 1893. His daughter Catherine "Kate" Everit Macy (1863–1945) continued the Macy family's philanthropic habits throughout her entire life, and by the time of her death in 1945, the Josiah Macy, Jr. Foundation had received about $19 million from her and her estate. Macy's son V. Everit Macy (1871–1930) was a prominent statesman in Westchester County, New York, and a benefactor of Teachers College, Columbia University. Macy's wife, Caroline Louisa Everett, lived from December 1838 to December 31, 1898.

Josiah W. Macy Jr. died at age 39 in 1876 of typhoid fever. Upon his death, his thirteen-year-old daughter Kate inherited $15 million, while his five-year-old son V. Everit inherited over $20 million.

Josiah Macy Jr. Foundation 
The Josiah Macy Jr. Foundation was endowed in the name of Captain Josiah W. Macy Jr. by his daughter (Catherine "Kate" Everit Macy) in 1930. Time magazine in 1930 reported that the Foundation created a fellowship "to pay the expenses of an assistant for Albert Einstein. First incumbent will be Dr. Einstein's good friend and familiar, Dr. Walter Mayer, mathematician at the University of Vienna."

References 

Year of birth uncertain
1876 deaths
Josiah Macy Jr. Foundation people
1837 births